Paradis is a surname. Notable people with the surname include:

Alodie-Virginie Paradis (1840–1912), Canadian Roman Catholic nun beatified in 1984
Alysson Paradis (born 1984), French actress
Carly Paradis, Canadian composer and pianist
Caterina Albert i Paradis (1869-1966), Spanish writer under the pen name Víctor Català
Christian Paradis (born 1974), Canadian politician
Denis Paradis (born 1949), Canadian politician
Élisabeth Paradis (born 1992), Canadian ice dancer
François Paradis, Canadian politician elected to the National Assembly of Quebec in 2014
François-Xavier Paradis (1844–1910), Canadian politician
Jean Jacques Paradis CMM, CD (1928–2007), the Commander, Mobile Command of the Canadian Forces
Judy Paradis (born 1944), American politician from Maine
Louis Paradis (born 1959), Canadian comics artist, writer and illustrator
Manuel Osborne-Paradis (born 1984), World Cup alpine ski racer from Canada
Maria Theresia von Paradis (1759–1824), Austrian performer and composer
Marie Paradis (1778–1839), Frenchwoman, first woman to climb Mont Blanc
Matt Paradis (born 1991), American football center
Pascale Paradis (born 1966), former professional tennis player from France
Patrick Paradis, politician from Augusta, Maine in the United States
Philippe Paradis (born 1991), Canadian ice hockey player
Philippe-Jacques Paradis (1868–1933), manufacturer and political figure in Quebec
Pierre Paradis (born 1950), Quebec politician and former cabinet minister
Roland Paradis (1696–1754), silversmith in Canada
Suzanne Paradis (born 1936), Canadian poet, novelist and critic based in Quebec
Vanessa Paradis (born 1972), French singer and actress

See also
Paradis (disambiguation)